King Arthur is a 2004 historical adventure film directed by Antoine Fuqua and written by David Franzoni. It features an ensemble cast with Clive Owen as the title character, Ioan Gruffudd as Lancelot and Keira Knightley as Guinevere, along with Mads Mikkelsen, Joel Edgerton, Hugh Dancy, Ray Winstone, Ray Stevenson, Stephen Dillane, Stellan Skarsgård and Til Schweiger.

The film is unusual in reinterpreting Arthur as a Roman officer rather than the typical medieval knight. There have been several literary works that have also done so, including David Gemmell's Ghost King, Jack Whyte's Camulod Chronicles, and perhaps the strongest influence on this film, Bernard Cornwell's Warlord series. The producers of the film attempted to market it as a more historically accurate version of the Arthurian legends, supposedly inspired by new archaeological findings. The film also replaces the sword in the stone story with a more dark and tragic backstory of how Arthur claimed his sword Excalibur. The film was shot in Ireland, England, and Wales.

Plot
In the 5th century AD, the declining Roman Empire is withdrawing from Britannia, where the native Woads, led by Merlin, stage an insurgency. A group of Sarmatian knights and their half-British Roman commander Artorius Castus, known as "Arthur", have fulfilled their duties to Rome and are preparing to return home. Arthur himself plans to continue his career in Rome until Bishop Germanus orders them to complete one final mission: evacuate an important Roman family from north of Hadrian's Wall, saving them from an advancing army of invading Saxons led by the ruthless Cerdic and his son, Cynric. Alecto, the son of the family patriarch, is a viable candidate to be a future Pope. Arthur and his remaining men – Lancelot, Tristan, Galahad, Bors, Gawain, and Dagonet – reluctantly accept the mission.

Arriving at their destination, they find that the Roman patriarch Marius, who refuses to leave, has enslaved the local population, enraging Arthur. He discovers a cell complex containing a number of dead Woads and two tortured survivors — a young woman named Guinevere and her younger brother Lucan. Arthur frees them and gives Marius an ultimatum — leave with them willingly or otherwise be taken prisoner. He and his knights commandeer the homestead, and liberate its exploited people. The convoy flees into the mountains with the Saxons in pursuit. Marius leads an attempted coup but is slain by Guinevere. Arthur learns from Alecto that Germanus and his fellow bishops had Arthur's childhood mentor and father figure, Pelagius, executed for heresy. This further disillusions Arthur with the Roman way of life, a process that matures when Guinevere and Merlin remind Arthur of his connection to the island of Britain through his Celtic mother.

Arthur leads the pursuing Saxons, led by Cynric, through a pass crossing a frozen lake. As battle ensues, Dagonet sacrifices himself to crack the lake ice with his axe, disrupting the Saxon advance. The knights safely deliver Alecto and his mother to Hadrian's wall and are officially discharged. Arthur, having concluded that his destiny lies with his mother's people, decides to engage the Saxons despite Lancelot's pleas to leave with them. The night before the battle, he and Guinevere make love, and on the following day, Arthur meets Cerdic under a white flag of parley, vowing to kill him. He is soon joined by Lancelot and his fellow knights, who decide to fight. In the climactic Battle of Badon Hill, the Woads and knights whittle the Saxon army. Guinevere engages Cynric, who overwhelms her. Lancelot aids her and kills Cynric but is fatally wounded. Cerdic kills Tristan before facing off against Arthur, who kills the Saxon leader, condemning the invaders to defeat.

Arthur and Guinevere marry and Merlin proclaims Arthur as King of the Britons. United by their defeat of the Saxons and the retreat of the Romans, Arthur promises to lead the Britons against any future invaders. Three horses that had belonged to Tristan, Dagonet and Lancelot run free across the landscape, as the closing narrative from Lancelot describes how fallen knights live on in tales passed from generation to generation.

Cast

Production
The film was produced by Jerry Bruckheimer and directed by Antoine Fuqua; David Franzoni, the writer of the original draft script for Gladiator, wrote the screenplay. The historical consultant for the film was John Matthews, an author known for his books on esoteric Celtic spirituality, some of which he co-wrote with his wife Caitlin Matthews. The research consultant was Linda A. Malcor, co-author of From Scythia to Camelot: A Radical Reinterpretation of the Legends of King Arthur, the Knights of the Round Table, and the Holy Grail, in which possible non-Celtic sources for the Arthurian legends are explored.

The film's main set, a replica of a section of Hadrian's Wall, was the largest film set ever built in Ireland, and was located in a field in County Kildare. The replica was one kilometre long, which took a crew of 300 building workers four and a half months to build. The fort in the film was based on the Roman fort named Vindolanda, which was built around 80 AD just south of Hadrian's Wall in what is now called Chesterholm in Northern England.

Fuqua was reportedly dissatisfied with the film which he attributed to interference by Disney. Fuqua said of the experience: “Did I get to make the movie I wanted? No and no,” he says of both versions. “I started out making the movie I wanted, but that was before they (Disney) started to police me. They said, ‘Try not to show so much blood.’ If you agree to make a gritty, dark, realistic film, then everything should be like that. I mean, it’s set in the Dark Ages, when people were inconsiderate and decided to bleed everywhere.”

Relationship with Arthurian legend

Cinematic versus traditional portrayal

The film's storyline is not taken from the traditional sources, but is a work of creative fiction. The only notable exception to this is the inclusion of the Saxons as Arthur's adversaries and the Battle of Badon Hill. Most traditional elements of Arthurian legend are dropped, such as the Holy Grail and Tristan's lover Iseult. The film barely includes the love triangle between Arthur, Lancelot and Guinevere; while Guinevere and Arthur are romantically involved, only a few sequences depict a possible relationship between Lancelot and Guinevere. The film does not feature Kay and Bedivere.

The knights' characterisations in Arthurian legend are also dropped. For example, the film's portrayal of a boorish and lusty Bors, the father of many children, differs greatly from his namesake whose purity and celibacy allowed him to witness the Holy Grail according to legend. The cinematic portrayal of Bors is therefore much closer to the traditional depiction of Sir Kay than his legendary namesake. Lancelot and Galahad are portrayed as having similar ages, whereas according to traditional versions they are father and son, respectively (the film's approach is also found in modern Arthurian fiction — such as Bernard Cornwell's The Warlord Chronicles, in which they are brothers).

The cinematic portrayal of Guinevere as a Celtic warrior who joins Arthur's knights in battle is a drastic alteration from the demure "damsel in distress" of courtly romance.  Although there is historical and mythological precedent for "sword-swinging warrior queens", such as the British Boudica of the Iceni, Gwenllian ferch Gruffydd of Wales, or the various Celtic war goddesses, the film's portrayal of Guinevere is actually closer to the Queen Medb of the Irish Táin Bó Cúailnge.  However, no source, early or late, describes Guinevere as either a warrior or a rustic Celt; in fact, in Geoffrey of Monmouth's Historia Regum Britanniae, which contains one of the oldest accounts of the character, Guinevere has Roman blood while Arthur is an indigenous Celt.

Despite the film's alleged historical angle, Merlin was not originally part of the legends. It is generally agreed that he is based on two figures—Myrddin Wyllt (Myrddin the Wild), and Aurelius Ambrosius, a highly fictionalised version of the historical war leader Ambrosius Aurelianus. The former had nothing to do with Arthur and flourished after the Arthurian period. The composite Merlin was created by Geoffrey of Monmouth.

Differences between the film and the Arthurian legend
In the film, Arthur's father is a Roman general from the Imperial Roman army and his mother is a Celtic woman. In the historical notes of the legend, Arthur's father is Uther Pendragon, a famous Romano-British commander and one of Britain's earlier kings, and his mother is Igraine, a beautiful young woman who was once the wife of Gorlois, the Duke of Cornwall and one of Uther's loyal subjects.

Arthur's knights are described differently in the film and the legend. In the film, Lancelot, Tristan, Bors and the other Knights of the Round Table are Sarmatian knights fighting for the glory of the Roman Empire. In historical notes, the Knights of the Round Table are Britons, knights of Romano-Celtic Britain fighting for the freedom of Britain against the Saxons.  A round table is briefly present in the movie, where Arthur's knights regularly meet in equality, and which flummoxes the bishop Germanus when he cannot find a place at the table to distinguish his stature.

Other references to Arthurian legend
Dagonet, a self-sacrificing warrior in the film, has Arthur's court jester as his namesake. The character appears in Le Morte d'Arthur and Idylls of the King. Also in the film, Lancelot fights using two swords. This may be a reference to the ill-fated Sir Balin, the "Knight with Two Swords", but this epithet refers to his cursed sword rather than his fighting style.

Tristan has a pet hawk. In Welsh legends, a figure named Gwalchmai is commonly considered identical with Gawain (both are nephews of Arthur); a popular though unlikely proposed meaning of his name is "hawk of May".

The role of traitor, typically ascribed to Mordred, is given a smaller part in the form of a young British scout, played by Alan Devine, who betrays his people to the Saxons. The character is unnamed, but called "British Scout" in the credits. Tristan kills the traitor with an arrow from the other side of Hadrian's Wall during the climactic battle.

Relationship with other works
Italian historian and novelist Valerio Massimo Manfredi claimed that the movie was almost a plagiarism of his 2002 novel The Last Legion, due to several similarities between the two works. These similarities include the reuse of some tropes and happenings present in the book and, especially, the attempt to give historical reliability to the main characters with the concept of King Arthur having Roman origins. Indeed, the events of the movie suggest a theory that is largely different from the one on which Manfredi's novel is based, in which Artorius Castus isn't even mentioned, and neither is the Sarmatian auxiliary army. According to Manfredi, King Arthur'''s release and its commercial failure were among the main causes of the problems related to the movie adaptation of his novel, which was in development hell until its release in 2007.

Historical notes
Despite the film's supposedly historically grounded approach, much artistic licence is taken regarding historical figures, peoples, events, religion, wardrobe, and weaponry. The film places the story of Arthur not in its better-known medieval setting, but in the (still plausible) earlier times of antiquity, the early dawn of the Middle Ages – as did the earliest versions of the Arthur story. It would appear that the Arthur depicted in the film is based most closely upon Ambrosius Aurelianus, the Romano-Briton who fought against the Saxons in the 5th century, and was probably the leader of the Romano-British at the Battle of Mons Badonicus (Mount Badon). Nevertheless, Arthur's full name in the film is Artorius Castus, referring to Lucius Artorius Castus, a historical Roman active in Britain in the 2nd or 3rd century. It is specified that Arthur was given the ancestral name of a legendary leader.

The film is loosely based on the "Sarmatian hypothesis", formulated by C. Scott Littleton and Ann C. Thomas in 1978, which holds that the Arthurian legend has a historical nucleus in the Sarmatian heavy cavalry troops stationed in Britain, referencing the similarities between the legends of king Arthur and the older legends of Nartian king Batraz.  In the 2nd century, 5,500 Iazyges were transported there as auxiliaries during the Marcomannic Wars. However, the hypothesis is not accepted by scholars who say it lacks a solid base.

Roman political issues
In the film, the Roman legions withdraw from Britain in AD 467; in reality, this was completed in the year 410, nearly 60 years before. Similarly, the opening text dictates that "King Arthur and his Knights rose from a real hero who lived [...] in a period often called the Dark Ages". The film, however, is set in 467. Some count the Dark Ages as beginning in Sub-Roman Britain, after the last Emperor of the Western Roman Empire, Romulus Augustus, was deposed by Odoacer in 476, nine years after the date for the setting of the film. The current Roman Emperor in the film's time would have been Anthemius.

The Roman family which Arthur rescues lives north of Hadrian's Wall (in modern Scotland). Such a mission would be unlikely. At times there were Roman expeditions and forts as far north as  Cawdor, near Inverness. There were periods, during the 2nd century, when Romans occupied areas as far north as the Central Lowlands (such as modern Falkirk, where pieces of the Antonine Wall are still visible).  Romanized client states such as that of the Votadini did exist north of the wall even into the Sub-Roman era. In general, however, Hadrian's Wall represented the extent of Roman rule in Britain.

Britons and Saxons
The Picts are called "Woads".Cathy Schultz, "KING ARTHUR: Romans and Saxons and Picts, oh my! ," History in the Movies  This word is a reference to one plant the Picts may have used to make blue paint; however, the use of woad by the Picts is contested by scholars, and the historical Picts were never known by this name. In an interview Antoine Fuqua stated that they used "Wodes" (sic) instead of "Picts" because they thought the latter sounded "a little weird".  Nevertheless, John Matthews said in an online article that the name substitution was "meant to echo similar belittling titles given to enemies".

The 9th century Anglo-Saxon Chronicle mentions the arrival of the Saxon leaders Cerdic and Cynric in Britain (in Hampshire) in 495. According to the Chronicle Cynric succeeded Cerdic as king of Wessex in 534 (Cerdic was the founder of the kingdom). Thus the two could not have died at the battle of Mount Badon. The battle is thought to have been fought sometime between 490 and 516.

The Saxons are shown attacking Hadrian's Wall from the north. By 467 the Saxons were already occupying parts of Britain far south of the wall. Later in the film, Cerdic stops a warrior from raping a woman because it would lead to less-than-pure Saxon blood. This scene references the long-held belief that the Anglo-Saxons eradicated the Romano-Britons from the eastern part of the island. This contention, largely based on linguistic evidence, has been challenged by modern genetic analysis, which suggests extensive mixing between Anglo-Saxon and Briton populations. Some historians (and fiction writers) have even suggested that Cerdic himself was at least part Briton. His name "Cerdic" has been argued to be a Germanised form of a Celtic name such as Ceretic or Caradoc.

Military technology

Historically, Sarmatians were armoured in the manner of cataphracts (full-length coats of scale armour); the film's Sarmatians are armoured with a mishmash of pseudo-Roman, Turkish, Mongol and Hunnic designs. The Saxons historically used bows (to a limited extent) and spears instead of crossbows during the period. Though there is evidence for the use of some form of crossbows by Romans (calling them manuballistae) and, some claim, the Picts, the weapon was still not widely used in England until much later.

Similarly, the Woads use a trebuchet-like weapon to hurl flaming missiles at the Saxons, though the trebuchet was not re-introduced to Britain until the Siege of Dover in 1216. The Romans, however, reportedly used an early form of the trebuchet in their sieges.

Roman soldiers displayed in the film are depicted as legionaries with 2nd century armour. By AD 400, legionaries were no longer in use and comitatenses were the new replacements.

Religious inaccuracies
The real Pelagius was a monk, not a bishop. He engaged Saint Augustine of Hippo in a debate on the theological issue of the relationship between grace and free will. However, the film confuses the issue of political freedoms and social choices (which were not issues in political debate in the 5th/6th centuries) with the principle of free will in relationship to God. When Arthur informs the people that "You ...were free from your first breath!", Roger Ebert notes that he is both "anticipating by a millennium or so the notion that all men are born free, and overlooking the detail that his knights have been pressed into involuntary servitude." The Pelagian heresy denied original sin with its doctrine of the bondage of the will and the need for healing by God's grace.  Nor was Pelagius executed for heresy in Rome as the film indicates. He is believed to have died decades before 467 AD, likely of old age.

St. Germanus of Auxerre's second (and last) mission to Britain was twenty years before (447 AD) and he died the following year. Germanus is venerated as a saint by the Catholic Church, Eastern Orthodox Church and Anglican Communion and, although portrayed in the film as a cruel and pompous aristocrat, historically he "extended his hospitality to all sorts of persons, washed the feet of the poor and served them with his own hands, while he himself fasted."

The film implies that the Pope (who in 467 was Pope Hilarius) was in control of the Western Roman Empire, although it was actually ruled by the Emperor and de facto controlled by the Magistri Militum and other regional governors. The Pope would not gain the political power to grant lands and other comparable privileges until centuries after the setting of the film. The film seems to be implying a literal interpretation of the Donation of Constantine, a document purportedly written in the 4th century, but in actuality an 8th-century forgery.

Promotion
Elements of the film's promotion have likewise been criticized as historically unsound. Its tagline "The True Story Behind the Legend" has been criticised as false.Youngs, Ian (2004). "King Arthur film history defended." BBC News Online. A trailer for the film claims that historians now agree that Arthur was a real person because of alleged "recent" archaeological findings, yet there is no consensus amongst historians on Arthur's historicityN. J. Higham, King Arthur, Myth-Making and History (London: Routledge, 2002), pp.11-37 has a good summary of the debate on Arthur's existence. and no recent archaeological find proves Arthur's existence; the so-called "Arthur stone", discovered in 1998 in securely dated 6th century contexts amongst the ruins at Tintagel Castle in Cornwall, created a stir but has subsequently been of little use as evidence.Green, Thomas. (1998 [2008]) Notes to "The Historicity and Historicisation of Arthur." www.arthuriana.co.uk

Reception
Box officeKing Arthur grossed $15 million on its opening weekend in third place behind Spider-Man 2 and Anchorman: The Legend of Ron Burgundy. It eventually grossed $51.9 million in the United States and Canada and $151.7 million in other territories for a worldwide total of $203.6 million, against a production budget of $120 million.

Critical response
On Rotten Tomatoes the film has an approval rating of 31% based on 190 reviews being positive with the critics consensus being "The magic is gone, leaving a dreary, generic action movie". On Metacritic the film has a score of 46 out of 100 based on reviews from 41 critics, indicating "mixed or average reviews". David Edelstein of Slate called the film "profoundly stupid and inept" and added, "it's an endless source of giggles once you realise that its historical revisionism has nothing to do with archeological discoveries and everything to do with the fact that no one at Disney would green-light an old-fashioned talky love triangle with a hero who dies and an adulterous heroine who ends up in a nunnery."  A. O. Scott of the New York Times further remarked that the film was "a blunt, glowering B picture, shot in murky fog and battlefield smoke, full of silly-sounding pomposity and swollen music (courtesy of the prolifically bombastic Hans Zimmer). The combat scenes, though boisterous and brutal, are no more coherent than the story, which requires almost as much exposition as the last Star Wars film. Luckily there is an element of broad, brawny camp that prevents King Arthur from being a complete drag."

Roger Ebert of the Chicago Sun-Times had a more positive response to the film and awarded it three out of four stars, writing, "That the movie works is because of the considerable production qualities and the charisma of the actors, who bring more interest to the characters than they deserve. There is a kind of direct, unadorned conviction to the acting of Clive Owen and the others; raised on Shakespeare, trained for swordfights, with an idea of Arthurian legend in their heads since childhood, they don't seem out of time and place like the cast of Troy. They get on with it."

Robin Rowland criticised critics who criticized the film for its Dark Age setting. Rowland pointed out that several Arthurian novels are set in the Dark Ages, like Rosemary Sutcliff's Sword at Sunset and Mary Stewart's Merlin trilogy (The Crystal Cave, The Hollow Hills and The Last Enchantment''). However, these works have little in common with the film's story and Sarmatian angle. In response to criticism of the setting,  consultant on the film Linda A. Malcor said: "I think these film-makers did a better job than most could have done when it comes to giving us something besides knights in tin foil and damsels in chiffon.... [they] deserve a lot of praise for the effort that they made." Fellow Arthurian scholar Geoffrey Ashe's opinion was unfavorable.

Later director Antoine Fuqua said:“When I first signed on to the movie it was to shoot an R movie, and then half way through it - that changed, for all sorts of reasons. Obviously it's always money...That was very difficult for me and I had a tough time adjusting to that. I had to change a lot of my shooting style that I had set up because it just wouldn't have been possible to do certain things and get a PG-13 rating, just because it would have been more graphic. Like I said, tonally, I had a whole different mindset. So once that happened, while I was filming, it made it difficult.“

Director's cut
An unrated director's cut of the film was released; it has extra footage of battle scenes as well as more scenes between Lancelot and Guinevere, whose traditional love triangle with Arthur is only hinted at here. The battle scenes are also bloodier and more graphic.

Several scenes are also omitted from the director's cut, including one where the knights sit around a camp fire asking about their intended Sarmatian life, in which Bors reveals that his children do not even have names, most simply have numbers. In addition, a sex scene between Guinevere and Arthur is shifted to be chronologically before he is informed of the incoming Saxons towards Hadrian's Wall. This seemingly minor change arguably helps the story flow more smoothly. In the original film he is seen in full battle armour, contemplating a broken image of Pelagius on his floor, and then is disturbed by a call to come outside. When he comes outside, he is hastily putting on a shirt, and his hair is disheveled. In the Director's Cut, after an intimate moment between Arthur and Guinevere explaining Arthur's morals, they carry on into their sexual encounter, and are thus disturbed so that Arthur can be briefed on the Saxons. During the sexual encounter, he is wearing the same outfit he wears during the briefing. The scene where he is examining Pelagius's image is removed.

Marketing
Despite these many drastic diversions from the source material (including the Welsh Mabinogion), the producers of the film attempted to market it as a more historically accurate version of the Arthurian legends. Other liberties were taken with the actors' appearances: Keira Knightley's breasts were enlarged for the US theatrical film poster. This practice angered Knightley, who says that it "comes from market research that clearly shows that other women refuse to look at famous actresses and stars with small breasts." Later in 2006, Knightley claimed she is "not allowed to be on a magazine cover in the US without at least a C cup because it 'turns people off'."

Video game

See also
 List of films based on Arthurian legend
 List of historical drama films

References

External links

 
 
 
 

2000s historical films
2000s war films
2004 films
2000s action drama films
American historical films
American war drama films
Arthurian films
British action drama films
British historical films
British war drama films
2000s English-language films
Fiction set in Roman Britain
Films set in England
Films set in Ireland
Films set in the Roman Empire
Films set in the 5th century
Films set in Wales
Fictional-language films
Films set in classical antiquity
Scottish Gaelic-language films
Films produced by Jerry Bruckheimer
Latin-language films
Touchstone Pictures films
Films shot at Pinewood Studios
Films directed by Antoine Fuqua
Films scored by Hans Zimmer
Picts in fiction
2004 drama films
English-language Scottish films
English-language Welsh films
2000s American films
2000s British films